Blue Jeans is a 1975 Italian erotic-drama film  directed by Mario Imperoli and starring Gloria Guida.

Plot 
Daniela (Gloria Guida), nicknamed "Blue Jeans" after her cut-off jean shorts, is an underage streetwalker. She is caught by the police and claims that she is the illegitimate daughter of Dr. Carlo Anselmi (Paolo Carlini), a renowned restoration artist living in Latina countryside. Although Anselmi claims the opposite, Daniela's word is taken as a presumption of law and she is entrusted to Anselmi. Anselmi quickly bonds with his supposed newfound daughter, however their borderline-incestuous attraction causes friction with Anselmi's girlfriend Marisa (Annie Carol Edel). Things get further complicated when Daniela becomes involved with a mysterious man, Sergio (Gianluigi Chirizzi).

Cast 
 Gloria Guida: Daniela
 Paolo Carlini: Dr. Carlo Anselmi
 Annie Carol Edel: Marisa
 Gianluigi Chirizzi: Sergio Prandi
 Mario Pisu: Lawyer Mauro Franco
 Marco Tulli: Client

Reception

Box office
The film grossed about 310 million lire at the Italian box office.

Critical response
The film critic Vittorio Spiga referred to the film as "an adult comic book that flows into a real exaltation of the remarkable ass of Gloria Guida".

References

External links

1975 films
1970s erotic drama films
1975 crime drama films
Italian erotic drama films
Films about prostitution in Italy
Italian crime drama films
Incest in film
Films directed by Mario Imperoli
Films scored by Nico Fidenco
1970s Italian-language films
1970s Italian films